The Evidence-Based Veterinary Medicine Association (EBVMA) is an international, non-profit (501(c)(3)) professional organization founded with the mission of better organizing the emerging veterinary research, training, and practice of evidence-based veterinary medicine (EBVM)—the formal strategy to integrate the best critically designed and statistically evaluated research available combined with clinical expertise as well as the unique needs or wishes of each client in clinical practice. EBVM draws from and parallels the evidence-based medicine movement in human medicine.

The EBVMA website asserts: Evidence-based veterinary medicine is the formal strategy to integrate the best research evidence available combined with clinical expertise as well as the unique needs or wishes of each client in clinical practice. Much of this is based on results from research studies that have been critically-designed and statistically evaluated.

The EBVMA is based in Ridgeland, Mississippi, US, and was founded in 2004. Its counterpart in the United Kingdom is the Centre for Evidence-based Veterinary Medicine (CEVM) at the University of Nottingham.

Organization
The EBVMA governance model includes a Board of Directors (President, President-Elect, Immediate Past President, Executive Secretary and Treasurer), and an Executive Committee composed of Regional Directors, Chairs of Core Committees (Education, Research and Communications & Outreach) and their Organizational Liaisons.

References

External links
EBVMA website

2004 establishments in the United States
Health care-related professional associations based in the United States
Veterinary medicine-related professional associations
Veterinary medicine in the United States